Sivacanthion is an extinct genus of rodent from the Miocene of Pakistan.
The build of Sivacanthion is very like that of a modern Old World porcupine, although details of the anatomy suggest that it is not a direct ancestor but a side branch of Hystricidae known in the Indian sub-continent.

Sivacanthion lived on the ground and ate plants and fruit.

References

Sources
 World Encyclopedia of Dinosaurs & Prehistoric Creatures - Dougal Dixon

Miocene rodents
Miocene mammals of Asia
Prehistoric rodent genera
Miocene genus extinctions
Fossil taxa described in 1933
Hystricidae